The following are the winners of the 15th annual (1988) Origins Award, presented at Origins 1989:

External links
 1988 Origins Awards Winners

1988 awards
1998 awards in the United States
Origins Award winners